Afro-Colombian Day, or Día de la Afrocolombianidad is an annual commemoration of the abolition of slavery in Colombia on May 21, 1851. May 21 is also the day of the first established free town in the Americas, Palenque de San Basilio. Afro-Colombian Day was first celebrated in 2001.

Afro-Colombian Day hopes to show the natives the importance of the Afro population and the effect they have on the history of Colombia. Afro-Colombian Day celebrates the artistic, intellectual, and social contributions of Afro-Colombians in Colombia. During the event the people celebrate through food, music, art, and local folklore.

"For Rudesindo Castro, coordinator of ethno-education in the Black Community Organization (ORCONE, in its Spanish initials), "this celebration is a way of showing support to the Afro-Colombian community of our country." "The celebration also seeks to incentives the participation of the Afro community, public entities, private companies and the citizenship in general, under the motto of the actual administration, "Bogotá Without Indifference."

See also 
 Blacks and Whites' Carnival, Colombia
 Afro-Colombian

International:
 Black Awareness Day, Brazil
 Black History Month

References

External links 
 Conmemoración del Día de la Afrocolombianidad (in Spanish)
 All information you need of Afrocolombianidad (in Spanish)

Afro-Colombian
May observances